Sergei Yevgenyevich Chernogayev (born 20 March 1983) is a Russian former footballer.

External links
  Player page on the official Luch-Energiya website
 

Russian footballers
Russia under-21 international footballers
Living people
1983 births
FC Torpedo Moscow players
FC Torpedo-2 players
FC Shinnik Yaroslavl players
FC Luch Vladivostok players
Russian Premier League players
FC Volgar Astrakhan players
FC Salyut Belgorod players
Association football defenders
FC Dynamo Saint Petersburg players
FC MVD Rossii Moscow players